The 2002–03 FA Cup qualifying rounds opened the 122nd season of competition in England for 'The Football Association Challenge Cup' (FA Cup), the world's oldest association football single knockout competition. A total of 624 clubs were accepted for the competition, up 28 from the previous season’s 596.

The large number of clubs entering the tournament from lower down (levels 5 through 10) in the English football pyramid meant that the competition started with six rounds of preliminary (2) and qualifying (4) knockouts for these non-League teams. South Western Football League was the only level 10 league represented in the Cup, three clubs from the South Western Football League were the lowest-ranked clubs in competition. The 32 winning teams from Fourth Round Qualifying progressed to the First round proper, where League teams tiered at levels 3 and 4 entered the competition.

Calendar

Extra preliminary round
Matches played on Saturday 17 August 2002. 90 clubs from level 8 and level 9 of English football, entered at this stage of the competition, while other 237 clubs from levels 8–10 get a bye to the preliminary round.

Preliminary round
Matches played on weekend of Saturday 31 August 2002. A total of 396 clubs took part in this stage of the competition, including the 45 winners from the extra preliminary round, 237 clubs from levels 8–10, who get a bye in the extra preliminary round and 114 entering at this stage from the five divisions at level 7 of English football. The round featured three clubs from level 10 (all from the South Western Football League) in the competition, being the lowest ranked clubs in this round. Also, Gretna, who switched to the Scottish league system were excluded from the FA Cup.

First qualifying round
Matches on weekend of Saturday 14 September 2002. A total of 198 clubs took part in this stage of the competition, all having progressed from the preliminary round. Falmouth Town and St Blazey from the South Western Football League at Level 10 of English football were the lowest-ranked clubs to qualify for this round of the competition.

Second qualifying round
Matches played on weekend of Saturday 28 September 2002. A total of 168 clubs took part in this stage of the competition, including the 99 winners from the first qualifying round and 69 Level 6 clubs, from Premier divisions of the Isthmian League, Northern Premier League and Southern Football League, entering at this stage. The round featured St Blazey from the South Western Football League - the only level 10 league represented. Also, Great Harwood Town, Horden Colliery Welfare and Rossington Main from level 9 divisions were still in the competition.

Third qualifying round
Matches played on weekend of Saturday 12 October 2002. A total of 84 clubs took part, all having progressed from the second qualifying round. The round featured fourteen clubs from Level 8 still in the competition, being the lowest ranked clubs in this round.

Fourth qualifying round
Matches played on weekend of Saturday 26 October 2002. A total of 64 clubs took part, 42 having progressed from the third qualifying round and 22 clubs from Conference Premier, forming Level 5 of English football, entering at this stage. The round featured eight clubs from Level 8 still in the competition, being the lowest ranked clubs in this round.

2002–03 FA Cup
See 2002–03 FA Cup for details of the rounds from the first round proper onwards.

External links
 Football Club History Database: FA Cup 2002–03
 The FA Cup Archive

FA Cup qualifying rounds
Qual